The Tacoma Mall shooting was an attempted mass murder that occurred on November 20, 2005, at the Tacoma Mall in Tacoma, Washington, United States. The gunman, Dominick Maldonado, entered the mall with a semi-automatic Norinco MAK-90 rifle and a pistol, injuring six before he instigated four armed kidnappings.

Details
Dominick Maldonado entered the Tacoma shopping mall around 12:15pm, November 20, 2005, and quickly opened fire with a MAK-90 semi-automatic rifle. During the course of the shooting, Brendan (Dan) McKown, a mall employee, intervened. McKown drew his 9 mm CZ pistol but then had second thoughts of shooting "a kid". McKown (with his handgun still holstered) verbally commanded Maldonado to put down his gun. Maldonado's response was to fire on McKown, striking him once in the leg and four times in the torso, damaging McKown's spine and leaving him paralyzed. In addition to McKown, five other people were shot but not seriously injured, and a seventh person received a non-gunshot injury. At least one other person in the mall at the time also pulled a gun on Maldonado, but did not fire for fear of hitting innocent bystanders. No one was killed during the shooting.

Maldonado then took four people hostage in a Sam Goody store, including two employees, a customer, and a 12-year-old boy whom he only briefly held captive before releasing. The hostage situation lasted until 4 p.m. when Maldonado surrendered to a Tacoma police SWAT team without further incident.

Hostages taken during the incident chronicled their story on Biography Channel's I Survived....

Shooter
The perpetrator in the shootings was 20-year-old Dominick Sergio Maldonado (born September 22, 1985), who had an extensive juvenile criminal record including burglary, theft, and possession of burglary tools. He had also been given a court order not to possess any weapons. At the time of the shooting, Maldonado had recently separated from his girlfriend, and had been using methamphetamine without sleep for almost a week.

Trial and imprisonment
Maldonado was charged with eight counts of first-degree assault, four counts of first-degree kidnapping, and two counts of unlawful possession of a firearm. He pleaded not guilty to the charges and has since been through five different lawyers and three defense teams.

Maldonado was convicted on October 2, 2007, and sentenced to 163 years in prison on November 2. He unsuccessfully attempted to escape from the Clallam Bay Corrections Center on June 29, 2011. During the escape attempt, Maldonado took a corrections officer hostage using a pair of scissors. Kevin Newland, a second inmate, was shot and killed by a guard after driving a forklift through a set of doors and crashing it into a perimeter fence.

Citing "safety/security concerns", the Washington State Department of Corrections transferred Maldonado to ADX Florence in Colorado on May 11, 2016.

See also
Westroads Mall shooting
Trolley Square shooting
Sello mall shooting

References

2005 in Washington (state)
2005 mass shootings in the United States
Mass shootings in the United States
Non-fatal shootings
Attacks in the United States in 2005
Crimes in Washington (state)
Hostage taking in the United States
Attacks on shopping malls
Mass shootings in Washington (state)
Attacks on buildings and structures in the United States
November 2005 crimes
November 2005 events in the United States